Khandwa district, formerly known as the East Nimar district, is a district of the Madhya Pradesh state in central India. The city of Khandwa is the administrative headquarters of the district. Other notable towns in the district include Mundi, Harsud, Pandhana and Omkareshwar.

Geography
Khandwa District lies in the Nimar region, which includes the lower valley of the Narmada River, Kherkhali River, Choti Tawa River, Shiva River. The Narmada forms part of the northern boundary of the district, and the Satpura Range form the southern boundary of the district. Burhanpur District, to the south, lies in the basin of the Tapti River. The pass through the Satpuras connecting Khandwa and Burhanpur is one of the main routes connecting northern and southern India, and the fortress of Asirgarh, which commands the pass, is known as the "Key to the Deccan". Betul and Harda districts lie to the east, Dewas District to the north, and Khargone District to the west.

History
Khandwa district was surrendered by the Marathas to the British Raj in 1818, and later became part of the Central Provinces and Berar. The area to the west, which forms the present Khargone district, was part of the princely state of Indore. After India's independence in 1947, the Central Provinces and Berar became the new Indian state of Madhya Pradesh.

The Khandwa district was known as "Nimar District" before 1956, when the state of Madhya Bharat to the west was merged with the state of Madhya Pradesh. Later it came to be called "East Nimar district", and a separate "West Nimar district" with headquarters at Khargone was established. The East Nimar district was part of the Nerbudda (Narmada) Division of the Central Provinces and Berar, which became the state of Madhya Bharat (later Madhya Pradesh) after India's independence in 1947. Khandwa was known as East Nimar until recently. Burhanpur District was separated from Khandwa District on 15 August 2003. Khandwa District is part of Indore Division.

Economy
In 2006 the Ministry of Panchayati Raj named Khandwa one of the country's 250 most backward districts (out of a total of 640). It is one of the 24 districts in Madhya Pradesh currently receiving funds from the Backward Regions Grant Fund Programme (BRGF).

Demographics

According to the 2011 census Khandwa District has a population of 1,310,061, This gives it a ranking of 374th in India (out of a total of 640). Its population growth rate over the decade 2001–2011 was 21.44%. East Nimar has a sex ratio of 944 females for every 1,000 males, and a literacy rate of 67.53%. 19.80% of the population lives in urban areas. Scheduled Castes and Scheduled Tribes make up 11.95% and 35.05% of the population respectively.

Languages

At the time of the 2011 Census of India, 40.59% of the population in the district spoke Nimadi, 33.84% Hindi, 9.71% Korku, 3.20% Urdu, 2.94% Bhili, 2.06% Bareli, 1.67% Banjari, 1.24% Gondi, 1.05% Marathi and 0.97% Bhilali as their first language.

Languages spoken include Nimadi, a Bhil language with approximately 64 000 speakers, written in the Devanagari script.

Cities of Khandwa
Major cities of Khnadwa include Khandwa, Mundi, Harsud, Pandhana and Omkareshwar.

Notable people

 Ashok Kumar
 Kishore Kumar, singer and actor
 Anoop Kumar 
 Bhagwantrao Mandloi, former Chief Minister of Madhya Pradesh
 Pt. Makhanlal Chaturvedi, Hindi poet & freedom fighter
 Shaan (singer)
 Saroo Brierley was born in Khandwa and lived there until about the age of five years when he was lost and adopted by a family in Australia

See also
Mahishmati

References

External links

 Official website
 Khandwa Mandi Bhav

 
Districts of Madhya Pradesh